David Boo Wiklander (born 3 October 1984) is a Swedish former footballer who played as a defender.

Personal life

Boo Wiklander was born in Colombia. When he was a few months old he was adopted to Sweden where he grew up.

Honours
IFK Norrköping
Allsvenskan: 2015

References

External links

1984 births
Living people
Colombian emigrants to Sweden
Swedish adoptees
Swedish footballers
Swedish people of Colombian descent
Association football midfielders
Qviding FIF players
IFK Norrköping players
Hammarby Fotboll players
IFK Göteborg players
Allsvenskan players
Superettan players